Jørgen Kiil (Jørgen Peter Christiansen Kiil; 13 February 1931 in Aarhus, Denmark – June 1, 2003 in Copenhagen, Denmark) was a Danish actor who appeared in more than fifty films between 1961 and 2003.

Selected filmography

References

External links 

1931 births
2003 deaths
Danish male film actors
Danish male television actors
People from Aarhus